Over Norton is a village and civil parish within the West Oxfordshire district, about  north of Chipping Norton, Oxfordshire, England. Over Norton Park is a farm beside the village.

References

External links

 Over Norton Parish Council

Civil parishes in Oxfordshire
Villages in Oxfordshire
West Oxfordshire District
Cotswolds